Thomas Mann Randolph Sr. (1741–November 13, 1793) served in the Virginia House of Burgesses, the Revolutionary conventions of 1775 and 1776, and the Virginia state legislature. Married twice, he fathered 15 children. One marriage was to a cousin, Anne Cary, with whom they had 13 children. His second marriage, which resulted in two children, caused a dissention among family members. The youngest son, with the same name as his half-brother, Thomas Mann Randolph, inherited the family plantation, Tuckahoe plantation. Randolph expanded upon the house that began to be built during his parents' short marriage. Orphaned as a young boy, Randolph continued work on Tuckahoe when he came of age. He also purchased Salisbury house, which was used during his lifetime as a hunting lodge.

Early life
Randolph was the only son of William Randolph III (1712–1745) and Maria Judith Page (died 1744), the daughter of Mann Page of the Rosewell plantation. The Randolph family of Virginia were among the First Families of Virginia. He was the grandson of Thomas Randolph of Tuckahoe and descendant of William Randolph (c.1650–1711).

Randolph's parents were married in 1736 and her father provided a £2000 sterling dowry that was used to built an "elegant new two-story mansion. By 1742, Maria Page Randolph had died. William Randolph died in 1745. William Randolph stipulated in his will of late 1745 that he wanted his good friend Peter Jefferson and his first cousin and Peter's wife, Jane Randolph Jefferson, to take care of his son and two daughters at Tuckahoe Plantation and provide the children a good education until Thomas Mann Randolph came of age. Peter Jefferson also managed the plantation's business affairs.

The Jeffersons left their residence at Shadwell, Virginia, with their three daughters and son, Thomas Jefferson, in 1746. Second cousins, Randolph and Thomas Jefferson were close during their childhood at Tuckahoe. The boys were tutored at Tuckahoe on English spelling, grammar, and composition. Thomas Jefferson maintained relationships with his Randolph family members, particularly the Randolphs at Tuckahoe.

Marriages and children 

In 1761, Thomas Mann Randolph Sr. married Anne Cary (1745–1789), the daughter of Archibald Cary and Mary Randolph Cary of Ampthill. Anne and Thomas were second cousins. He came of age in 1762. Randolph worked on construction of the mansion sometime between 1760 and 1765, perhaps partially funded by a dowry for his wife. The house came to have an h-shaped layout, with a north wing, hyphen, and a south wing. The mansion was built for a large family and entertaining. Construction was completed by 1769 when Englishman Thomas Anburey visited Tuckahoe. He wrote that the mansion

Ann Cary and Thomas Mann Randolph had thirteen children, which include:
 Mary Randolph (1762–1828), married David Mead Randolph, she was the author of The Virginia House-Wife (1824)
 Henry Cary Randolph, born about 1763 and died as an infant
 Elizabeth Randolph, born about 1765, married Robert Pleasants of Filmer about 1785
 Thomas Mann Randolph Jr. (October 1, 1768 – June 20, 1828) an American planter, soldier, and politician, including Governor of Virginia. Married Martha Jefferson
 William Randolph, born about 1769, married Lucy Bolling, the daughter of Beverley Randolph about 1794
 Archibald Cary Randolph, born about 1771, died an infant
 Judith Randolph, born about 1773, married Richard Randolph of the Bizarre plantation and tried for the Bizarre Plantation scandal
 Ann Cary "Nancy" Randolph (1774–1837), wife of Gouverneur Morris.  Nancy was harassed throughout her life because of an alleged unwed teenage pregnancy and subsequent suspicion of abortion that was detailed in a sensational murder trial at the time where she was defended by both John Marshall and Patrick Henry who secured her acquittal for lack of evidence.  She later claimed a stillborn birth had occurred after a member of her own family relentlessly pursued her in the court of public opinion.
 Jane Cary Randolph, born about 1777, married Thomas Eston Randolph of Bristol, England about 1797
Dr. John Randolph, born about 1779, married Judith Lewis
 George Washington Randolph, born about 1781, died an infant
 Harriet Randolph, born about 1783, married Richard S. Hackley of New York about 1803
 Virginia Randolph Cary (1786–1852), author of Letters on Female Character (1828)

Ann Cary Randolph died in 1789. In 1790, a few months after his first wife's death, the 49-year-old Thomas Mann Randolph Sr. married Gabriella Harvie, the daughter of John Harvie Jr. She was 17 years of age, and he was more than twice her age.

The children of Gabriella Harvie and Thomas Mann Randolph are:
 A baby daughter who died while an infant.
 Thomas Mann Randolph (1792–1848), was born before 1793 when Randolph died. This son had the same name as the son of his first wife which caused a great deal of division among the family.

The children from Randolph's first marriage did not visit Tuckahoe after the second marriage.

Career
Randolph served during the Revolutionary War where he acquired the name "Colonel Randolph". He served in the Virginia House of Burgesses, the Revolutionary conventions of 1775 and 1776, and the Virginia state senate in 1776. He was a member of the House of Delegates from 1784 to 1788 and was County Lieutenant of Goochland County.

Salisbury house
In 1777, Thomas Mann Randolph Sr. purchased the Salisbury house from Abraham Salle (a Huguenot descendant of Abraham Salle (1670–ca. 1719)). The estate in Chesterfield County, Virginia (14 miles from Richmond, directly across the River from the Randolph-owned Tuckahoe) became a Randolph family hunting lodge. In 1784 Patrick Henry lived at Salisbury during his second term as Virginia governor (1784 to 1786).

Death
Randolph died on November 13, 1793. The second Thomas Mann Randolph, Gabriella's son, inherited Tuckahoe. After Randolph's death, Gabriella married Dr. John Brockenbrough of Richmond by 1798.

Notes

References

1741 births
1793 deaths
People from Virginia
House of Burgesses members
Randolph family of Virginia
18th-century American politicians